Emily Ann Engstler (born May 1, 2000) is an American professional basketball player for the Indiana Fever of the Women's National Basketball Association (WNBA). She played for Syracuse during her first three years at the college level, then for Louisville, earning first-team All-ACC honors in her only season with the team. Engstler graduated from St. Francis Preparatory School in Queens, New York, where she was rated a five-star recruit by ESPN and named a McDonald's All-American.

Early life and high school career
Engstler was born on May 1, 2000, in Queens, New York, to Marilyn and William Engstler, and moved to Roosevelt Island by the age of eight. She first picked up a basketball as a three-year-old and grew up playing for boys' Catholic Youth Organization teams at Resurrection Ascension Catholic Academy. 
Engstler also played pick-up games on outdoor courts across the street from her home. She modeled her game after Elena Delle Donne and Kevin Durant. In her freshman season, Engstler played for Christ the King Regional High School in Queens, where her mother had played basketball. After one year, she transferred to St. Francis Preparatory School in Queens, seeking a better academic fit, and sat out for her sophomore year due to Catholic High School Athletic Association (CHSAA) transfer rules.

As a junior, Engstler averaged 19 points, 15.7 rebounds, 5.9 blocks and 3.4 steals per game. She recorded the first quadruple-double in school history, with 27 points, 29 rebounds, 11 assists and 10 blocks, against Nazareth Regional High School. Engstler was named to the New York State Sportswriters Association (NYSSWA) Class AA all-state sixth team. In her senior season, she averaged 18.3 points, 11.5 rebounds, 3.7 assists, 3.3 steals and 2.1 blocks per game, receiving New York Gatorade Player of the Year and NYSSWA Class AA all-state first team accolades. She helped her team achieve a 19–9 record and reach the Brooklyn/Queens CHSAA title game. Engstler was selected to play in the McDonald's All-American Game and the Jordan Brand Classic.

Recruiting
Engstler was considered a five-star recruit and the ninth-best player in the 2018 class by ESPN. On October 19, 2017, she committed to play college basketball for Syracuse over offers from Ohio State and Miami (Florida). Engstler was drawn to the school because of its proximity to her home and its reputed program in broadcast journalism, her intended major.

College career
Engstler came off the bench during her freshman season at Syracuse. On February 21, 2019, she recorded a season-high 17 points, six rebounds, three assists and three blocks in a 90–63 win over Pittsburgh. As a freshman, Engstler averaged 4.9 points and 4.5 rebounds in 14.2 minutes per game. With the departure of small forward Miranda Drummond, she entered the starting lineup in her sophomore season. On December 20, 2019, Engstler posted 13 points, a season-high 17 rebounds and five assists in a 77–63 victory over Michigan State. On January 5, 2020, she recorded a season-high 22 points and 15 rebounds in a 74–63 victory against Notre Dame. As a sophomore, Engstler averaged nine points, 9.2 rebounds and 1.6 blocks per game, leading her team in rebounds and blocks. She suffered from depression during the season. Engstler improved her endurance and mental health by exercising routinely during COVID-19 pandemic lockdown under the guidance of her older sister, Danielle. She lost about 40 lbs (18 kg) in the offseason through exercise and dieting.

Engstler returned to a reserve role in her junior season, but remained one of Syracuse's most productive players. In the quarterfinals of the 2021 ACC tournament, she made a game-winning, buzzer beating layup in a 90–89 win over Florida State. Engstler registered a career-high 21 points and 10 rebounds in a 72–59 loss to Louisville at the semifinals. She was selected to the all-tournament second team. As a junior, Engstler averaged 10.5 points and 9.1 rebounds per game, earning ACC Co-Sixth Player of the Year honors. She led Syracuse in rebounds, steals and three-point field goal percentage. For her senior season, Engstler transferred to Louisville, being drawn to the program by head coach Jeff Walz. On January 2, 2022, she made a game-winning layup with three seconds left in a 50–48 victory over Georgia Tech. On March 26, Engstler matched her season-high of 20 points while grabbing 10 rebounds in a 76–64 win against Tennessee at the Sweet 16 of the NCAA tournament. She helped Louisville reach the Final Four of the tournament. As a senior, Engstler averaged 11.9 points, 9.4 rebounds, 2.7 steals and 1.8 blocks per game, and was named to the first-team All-Atlantic Coast Conference and All-Defensive Team. On March 29, she declared for the 2022 WNBA draft, forgoing her additional year of college eligibility granted due to the COVID-19 pandemic.

Professional career
Engstler was selected by the Indiana Fever with the fourth overall pick in the 2022 WNBA draft. On August 12, 2022, she scored a season-high 18 points, five rebounds and three blocks in an 82–70 loss to the Washington Mystics. In her rookie season, Engstler averaged 5.2 points and 5.2 rebounds per game, making six starts in 35 games. After the WNBA season, she played for Flammes Carolo Basket of the Ligue Féminine de Basketball in France.

WNBA career statistics

Regular season

|-
| align="left" | 2022
| align="left" | Indiana
| 35 || 6 || 18.2 || .396 || .356 || .553 || 5.2 || 1.5 || 0.7 || 1.1 || 1.4 || 5.2
|-
| align="left" | Career
| align="left" | 1 year, 1 team
| 35 || 6 || 18.2 || .396 || .356 || .553 || 5.2 || 1.5 || 0.7 || 1.1 || 1.4 || 5.2

National team career
In August 2021, Engstler played for the United States national 3x3 team at the FIBA 3x3 Under-23 Nations League in France. She helped the team finish with a 5–3 record. Engstler won a silver medal at the 2022 FIBA 3x3 U23 World Cup in Romania.

References

External links
Louisville Cardinals bio
Syracuse Orange bio
USA Basketball bio

2000 births
Living people
American women's basketball players
Basketball players from New York City
Sportspeople from Queens, New York
Louisville Cardinals women's basketball players
Syracuse Orange women's basketball players
McDonald's High School All-Americans
Small forwards
Power forwards (basketball)
Indiana Fever draft picks
Indiana Fever players